Nicolás Suárez is one of the five provinces of the Bolivian Pando department and is situated in the department's northwestern parts. Its name honors Nicolás Suárez Callaú (1861-1940) who owned major parts of today's Pando and Beni Departments in the times of the caoutchouc-boom.

Location 
Nicolás Suárez Province is located between 10° 39' and 11° 27' South and between 67° 33' and 69° 34' West. It extends over a length of 370 km from Northeast to Southwest, and up to 100 km from North to South.

The province is situated in the Amazon lowlands of Bolivia and borders Brazil in the North, Peru in the West, Manuripi Province in the South, and Abuná Province in the East.

Population 
The population of Nicolás Suárez Province has increased by almost 200% over the recent two decades:
1992: 18,447 inhabitants (census)
2001: 29,536 inhabitants (census)
2005: 39,577 inhabitants (est.)
2010: 51,377 inhabitants (est.)
 
 42.4% of the population are younger than 15 years old. (1992)

 84.7% of the population speak Spanish, 4.9% speak Quechua, and 3.1% speak Aymara (1992).

The literacy rate of the province's population is 78.1%. (1992)

 51.9% of the population have no access to electricity, 33.0% have no sanitary facilities. (1992)

 83.9% of the population are Catholics, 13.8% are Protestants. (1992)

Division 
The province comprises four municipalities:
Bella Flor Municipality - 2,305 inhabitants (2001)
Bolpebra Municipality - 1,194 inhabitants
Cobija Municipality - 22,324 inhabitants
Porvenir Municipality - 3,713 inhabitants

See also 
 Porvenir Massacre

References

External links 
General map of province
Detailed map of province towns and rivers
Population data (Spanish)
Social data (Spanish)

Provinces of Pando Department